Conan the Adventurer was a comic book series published by Marvel Comics for 14 issues from 1994 to 1995.  Written by Roy Thomas and illustrated in most cases by Rafael Kayanan, it follows the travels of a young Conan the Barbarian, seeing the world for the first time.  It was aimed at a younger audience than the earlier Conan books.

Notes

External links
Conan the Adventurer at Comicvine
Conan the Adventurer at the Marvel Database Project
Conan the Adventurer at Atomic Avenue

Conan the Barbarian comics